Roland was an  64-gun ship of the line of the French Navy, launched in 1771.

Career 
From 1773 to 1775, Roland was the flagship of the Second voyage of Kerguelen.

Roland took part in the Battle of Ushant on 27 July 1778 under Gilart de Larchantel.

Fate 
Roland was destroyed in an accidental fire in Brest, along with the nearby frigate Zéphyr.

Citations and references 
Citations

References
 
 
 
  (1671-1870)

Ships of the line of the French Navy
1771 ships
Artésien-class ships of the line
Maritime incidents in 1779